National Route 62 (N62) forms part of the Philippine highway network. It runs south from Metro Manila to northeastern Cavite.

Route description 
Based on the designation by the Department of Public Works and Highways (DPWH), N62 consists of the following segments, from east to west:

Parañaque to Las Piñas 

N62 starts at the intersection with NAIA Road in Parañaque. The northern section forms a major north–south collector road in southern Metro Manila, Philippines. Originally a segment of the Calle Real, it is now a four-lane undivided arterial designated as a component of Manila's Radial Road 2 network. It runs parallel to Roxas Boulevard and its extension, the Manila–Cavite Expressway (Coastal Road). The northern section in Parañaque is known as Elpidio Quirino Avenue, while the southern section in Las Piñas is Padre Diego Cera Avenue.

Bacoor 

The southern section of the N62 forms part of the Emilio Aguinaldo Highway, also known as Cavite-Batangas Road and Manila West Road, from Zapote Bridge to Tirona Highway in Bacoor.

Aguinaldo Boulevard
From Bacoor Junction, N419 branches out from Aguinaldo Highway to Manila–Cavite Expressway's (CAVITEX) Bacoor (Longos) Exit as Aguinaldo Boulevard, a 6-lane,  thoroughfare serving the areas of Talaba, Zapote, and Longos in Bacoor. Longos Flyover, which carries the road over its junction with Alabang-Zapote Road and provides access to the northbound entrance to CAVITEX, is also part of N62.

Bacoor to Kawit

At the intersection near SM City Bacoor, N62 turns west towards Kawit as Tirona Highway, while Aguinaldo Highway continues south as N419.

Kawit to Noveleta
In Kawit, N62 turns south as the Magdiwang Highway, shifts towards a two-lane road in Barangay Magdalo, Kawit, becoming A. Bonifacio Street as it enters Noveleta. It then turns northwest at M. Salud Road, and returns to Magdiwang Highway before meeting the junction in Noveleta.

Noveleta to Cavite City 

Finally, N62 turns north at the junction in Noveleta as Manila–Cavite Road, forming the final stretch of the highway. In Cavite City, the road is known as Miranda Street (one-way southbound) and P. Burgos Avenue. At the latter's intersection with Dra. Salamanca Street, it carries one-way eastbound traffic only. It terminates at the Trece Martires Centennial Plaza by the Bacoor Bay in Barangay San Roque, where it continues as Parkway I towards Naval Base Cavite.

Landmarks 
Several landmarks and historical sites are situated along N62, including Aguinaldo Shrine in Kawit, Cavite, where the first Philippine Republic was proclaimed in 1898. SM City Bacoor, the first SM Supermall outside Metro Manila, is located at the intersection of Aguinaldo and Tirona Highways.

References

External links 
 Department of Public Works and Highways

Roads in Metro Manila
Roads in Cavite